Fabian Ernst (born 30 May 1979) is a German former professional footballer who played as a midfielder. He was regarded as a two-way player who can stop the opposition and start attacks with his passing from central midfield.

Club career
Born in Hanover, Ernst started his career with hometown club Hannover 96. From 1998 to 2000, he played for Hamburger SV in the Bundesliga, playing in 48 games, but scoring no goals.

The midfielder moved to Werder Bremen in 2000, where he was a major force in the league and won a  cup double in 2004. In 152 games in the Bundesliga, he scored 11 goals.

He left after spending three and a half years at Schalke and joined Beşiktaş J.K. on 2 February 2009, signing a contract which lasted until 2012. In his first season with Beşiktaş he scored two goals. An the end of the season, he was elected "The Best Player Of The Team" by the supporters.

On 16 September 2010, Ernst headed in a last-minute goal against Bulgarian side CSKA Sofia to help his team to a winning start in the group stages of the UEFA Europa League. In the 2012–13 season, he joined Kasımpaşa S.K., another football club headquartered in Istanbul. He was also captain of the team. In June 2013, he announced that he was thinking about retirement.

After a career break from the summer 2013 until the summer 2014, Ernst signed a contract with OSV Hannover although he had bids from other bigger clubs.

International career

In 2002, Ernst played his first international game, representing Germany against Kuwait. Ernst was a member of the German squad at Euro 2004. As of the end of 2007, he had won 24 caps and scored one goal for his country.

After that first season by Schalke 04, he found himself not being selected by his national squad for FIFA World Cup 2006, just like for Euro 2008 and FIFA World Cup 2010.

Managerial career
In July 2020, Beşiktaş J.K. and Ernst announced that their cooperation to establish youth academies across continental Europe, focusing in Germany, Austria, and the Netherlands.

Career statistics

Club

International

Scores and results list Germany's goal tally first, score column indicates score after Ernst goal.

Honours
Werder Bremen
 Bundesliga: 2003–04
 DFB-Pokal: 2003–04

Schalke 04
 DFB-Ligapokal: 2005

Beşiktaş
 Süper Lig: 2008–09
 Turkish Cup; 2008–09; 2010–11

Individual
 2008–09 Golden Team of the Year – Süper Lig

References

External links
  
 
 
 
 

1979 births
Living people
German footballers
Footballers from Hanover
Association football midfielders
Germany international footballers
Germany B international footballers
Germany under-21 international footballers
UEFA Euro 2004 players
2005 FIFA Confederations Cup players
Bundesliga players
Regionalliga players
Süper Lig players
Hannover 96 players
Hamburger SV players
SV Werder Bremen players
FC Schalke 04 players
Beşiktaş J.K. footballers
Kasımpaşa S.K. footballers
German expatriate footballers
German expatriate sportspeople in Turkey
Expatriate footballers in Turkey